Meadow Township may refer to the following townships in the United States:

 Meadow Township, Clay County, Iowa
 Meadow Township, Wadena County, Minnesota

See also 
 Meadow Brook Township, Cass County, Minnesota
 Meadow Lake Township, Barnes County, North Dakota
 Grand Meadow Township (disambiguation)
 Meadows Township (disambiguation)